Ari Meyers (born April 6, 1969) is an American former actress. She played the role of Emma Jane McArdle in the television series Kate & Allie (1984).

Early years
Meyers was born in San Juan, Puerto Rico, to Jewish American parents who were touring in the island. Her mother is actress Taro Meyer, who appeared in the television soap opera Another World. Shortly afterward, Meyer and her family returned to New York City where she was raised and where she received her primary and secondary education.

Career
In 1982, Meyers landed her first major role as the stepdaughter of Al Pacino in the movie Author! Author!. The following year, she also landed the role of Emma Jane McArdle on the TV series Kate & Allie. Meanwhile, she also continued to take advanced courses in school.

In 1988, Meyers left Kate & Allie and used her earnings to finish her studies at Yale University; from there she graduated with honors and a double major in Philosophy and Theatre Arts.

After graduating, Meyers continued acting and was mostly cast as characters much younger than her actual age. Meyers has also lent her voice in the recording of numerous audio books, such as:

 The Amy Fisher Story (1993)
 A Kitten's Tale (1995)
 The Wish (2000)

In 2003, Meyers appeared in the musical play Theophilus North (adopted from the 1973 novel) in New York City and in 2004 she participated in the play, Little Willy.  During a Kate & Allie online reunion in 2021, she said that she is working as a postpartum nurse and lactation consultant at a hospital in Los Angeles, California.

Filmography

See also

 List of Puerto Ricans
 Jewish immigration to Puerto Rico

References

External links
 
 
 

1969 births
20th-century American actresses
Living people
Puerto Rican actresses
American child actresses
American television actresses
People from San Juan, Puerto Rico
Actresses from New York City
Puerto Rican Jews
Yale University alumni